Edita Abdieski (born November 14, 1984) is a Swiss pop singer. She rose to fame during the debut series of the German X Factor show, which she won in November 2010.

Early life
Abdieski is the eldest child born to a Macedonian Albanian father and a Montenegrin Albanian mother. Raised in Bern alongside three younger siblings, she spent much of her childhood in the Bern borough of Bümpliz-Oberbottigen, where she was enrolled at primary and secondary school. Her father died of cancer in 1992. At eleven, Abdieski became part of her first school band and by the age of thirteen, she began writing songs. After leaving school, she was trained as qualified office employee, but as she hoped to embark on a professional singing career, Abdieski enrolled at the Swiss Musical Academy in Bern – much against the wishes of her mother, who was sceptical about her daughter's ambition, prompting Abdieski to leave home and move into a girls' flat-sharing community in 2002. To fund her academical training, she was forced to take four side jobs at times.'Career

2002—2009: Career beginnings
In 2002, a producer asked Abdieski and school friend Vanessa Tancredi to collaborate on a mundart album, a collection of songs in Swiss German dialect. Barely trained in mundart singing, Abdieski even so accepted the offer to record a full-length album, and during the following two years, the pair worked with production duo Thomas Fässler and Ben Mühlethaler on what would eventually become the debut album of Vanessædita.

Meanwhile, Abdieski was hired as a backing vocalist for the Swiss pop–rock band Lunik and worked with musician Santiago Cortés on his debut album Welcome to My Airline (2005). The album's leading single, "Don't Leave Me," sung and co-written by Abdieski, reached number forty on the Swiss Singles Chart. Still with Vanessædita, Abdieski was cast in the leading role of Kimberly in the musical Dance Me! – The Streetdance Musical in fall 2005. A same-titled album, on which she appeared along with her ensemble, was released in January 2006 but failed to chart.

After Vanessædita's contract signing with Muve Recordings, their album Z'Debü ("The Debut") was finally released in Switzerland in March 2006. Although its first single "Wenn ig nume wüsst" entered the top fifty of the Swiss Singles Chart, the pop soul–influenced album underperformed commercially, only reaching number eighty-two on the Swiss Albums Chart. In 2007, Abdieski and Tancredi disbanded amicably, citing musical differences. Abdieski later stated, that after one album, she had become aware that mundart singing was "not [her] thing."

2010: X Factor
Abdieski auditioned for the debut series of X Factor in 2010, singing Joss Stone's "Tell Me 'Bout It". She was mentored by Till Brönner and was announced the winner on November 9, 2010, winning a record deal with Sony Music.

2010: First Studio Album One 
In November and December 2010, Edita was recording her debut studio album which will be called One. The record will be released in March 2011. It will include her top ten hit "I've Come to Life" and her 2nd single "The Key" which was written by Jörgen Elofsson who has also written songs for Celine Dion Britney Spears and Il Divo. Another highlight will be a feature with Latin star Ricky Martin. The track is called "The Best Thing About Me Is You" and features writing from another Swedish heavyweight, Andreas Carlsson. Keeping up the Scandinavian presence are Norwegian production/songwriting teams Dsign Music and Tracksville ("When The Music Is Over"), as well as writers Mads Hauge ("Another Universe") and Torgeir Bjordal ("I Don't Know"). In January Edita won the DIVA Award in the category "Talent of the Year". Abdieski shot the video for her single "The Key" in Teneriffa. On January 25, 2011 it was confirmed that another track on One'' will be called "Give A Little Love, Get A Little Love". The song was written by Ben Cullum, Jamie Cullum's brother.

2011: Edita Club Tour and new album 
In June 2011, Edita was on her first Club Tour in four German and two Swiss cities. She presented two new songs called "Done With You" and "Really Love Me", which she wrote by herself. The two songs are from her expected upcoming second studio album.

Discography

Studio albums

Singles

Featuring Singles

Awards

|-
|2010
|rowspan=2|Edita Abdieski
|Diva Award – Talent of the Year
|
|-
|2011
|Prix Walo – Newcomer of the Year
|

See also
X Factor (Germany season 1)

References

External links
 
 

1984 births
Living people
English-language singers from Switzerland
21st-century Swiss women singers
The X Factor winners
Swiss people of Albanian descent
Swiss people of Macedonian descent
Swiss people of Montenegrin descent